Luffia lapidella is a moth of the Psychidae family. It is found in Europe including The Netherlands and Belgium.

The moth flies from June to July depending on the location. Females are wingless and unable to fly. Not all males can fly either. L. lapidella has partial parthenogenesis.

The larvae feed on algae and lichen.
The larvae and pupae live in cases. These are made from algae and grains of sand and are up to 7 millimeters long. They have a curved conical shape. The cases are very similar to those of L. ferchaultella . They are  found on tree trunks, rocks, walls and frames and have a preference for warm dry places. The caterpillar overwinters.

External links
Bestimmungshilfe für die in Europa nachgewiesenen Schmetterlingsarten
 Images representing Luffia lapidella at Consortium for the Barcode of Life
Lepidoptera of Belgium 

Psychidae
Moths of Europe
Moths described in 1783